Manju Prakash is an Indian politician, belonging to the Communist Party of India (Marxist). She served as a member of the Bihar Legislative Assembly for over 10 years from Buxar (Vidhan Sabha constituency). She got elected in 1990 and 1995. Her husband Ramdeo Verma also served as a member of the Bihar Legislative Assembly from Bibhutipur (Vidhan Sabha constituency). She has held the position of President of Bihar Women's Commission. After 2020, she left CPIM, and joined CPIML Liberation.

Her father Jyoti Prakash was also a communist. He was a Dalit leader and was killed by upper caste Rais.

Electoral record 
Prakash participated in the Bihar Legislative Election representing CPI(M) from Buxar in 1985, 1990, 1995, 2000, 2010 and as an Independent from Bibhutipur in 2020. She emerged victorious in 1990 and 1995.

References 

Communist Party of India (Marxist–Leninist) Liberation politicians
Communist Party of India (Marxist) politicians from Bihar
Living people
Politics of Buxar district
1965 births
Bihar MLAs 1990–1995
Bihar MLAs 1995–2000